The Superior Court of California, County of Glenn, also known as the Glenn County Superior Court or  Glenn Superior Court, is the branch of the California superior court with jurisdiction over Glenn County.

History
Glenn County was formed in 1891, partitioned from neighboring Colusa County.

The Glenn County Courthouse was completed in 1894 for the county seat in Willows; after the dome was damaged by an earthquake, it was removed in 1951. The dome was added at the request of county supervisors, who were concerned about rumors the contractor would go bankrupt before finishing the buildings. The courthouse was designed by John Curtis, who also designed the Placer County Courthouse. An annex was added in 1968, designed by Alvin Fingado and George T. Kern.

Because of the small population of the county, the superior court has two judges and one child support commissioner (under Assembly Bill 1058). After Hon. Peter Billiou Twede retired in 2018, Governor Jerry Brown appointed Hon. Alicia Ekland to the bench; she is the first female judge to serve Glenn County.

Construction started in December 2018 for a two-story annex behind the existing historic courthouse in Willows, replacing three single-story additions built in the 1940s. During construction, operations in Willows were moved temporarily to the Willows Memorial Hall.

Venues

Aside from the main courthouse in Willows, the superior court operates a branch courthouse in Orland, the county's largest city.

References

External links
 

Superior Court
Superior courts in California